Nani Boi (born Nnaemeka Charles Eze 23 March 1983) is a Nigerian screenwriter and author of children's books.

Biography

Nani Boi, an Igbo, was born in Nsukka, Enugu State. He is a native of Orba in Udenu Local Government  area, Enugu State, Nigeria. He is a Geology graduate from University of Nigeria Nsukka. He is diverse in the Nigerian Entertainment Industry He has written a lot of books, one of which include his early work Mummy Why which he later adapted to film in 2016. He is married to Actress Uloma Eze. He has had a few stints as a Musician, featuring artists like Mr Raw, Kcee, Dekumzy He is also a part-time Radio Presenter at Dream 92.5fm Enugu

Bibliography
Mummy Why. El 'Demak Publishers, 2008. 
The Twins. Nani Boi Productions, 2008. 
Young Talents. El 'Demak Publishers, 2008. 
Son of The Soil. El 'Demak Publishers, 2008. 
The Rich Girl and The Poor Boy. El 'Demal Publishers, 2008. 
Victims of Hunger. El 'Demak Publishers, 2008.

Filmography

Film

References

External links
 
Nani Boi at WorldCat
 

1983 births
Nigerian children's writers
21st-century Nigerian writers
21st-century male writers
Living people
Nigerian screenwriters
People from Enugu State
University of Nigeria alumni
Nigerian film actors